Dieter Runkel (born 21 December 1966 in Obergösgen) is a Swiss former cyclist.

Specializing in cyclo-cross, he won the UCI World Cyclo-cross Championships in 1995. He also rode in the 1993 Tour de France, finishing in 131st position.

Major results

Cyclo-cross

1987
 3rd National Championships
1992
 1st  National Championships
1995
 1st  UCI World Championships
 1st  National Championships
1996
 1st  National Championships
1997
 2nd National Championships
1998
 2nd National Championships
1999
 3rd National Championships

Road
1992
 1st Overall Grand Prix Guillaume Tell
1st Stage 3

References

External links

1966 births
Living people
Swiss male cyclists
UCI Cyclo-cross World Champions (men)
Cyclo-cross cyclists